ArenaBowl XXVII was the 27th edition of the championship in the Arena Football League. The National Conference champion Arizona Rattlers defeated the American Conference champion Cleveland Gladiators, 72–32. The game was played on August 23, 2014 at Quicken Loans Arena in Cleveland, Ohio, the home of the Gladiators.

This was the fourth consecutive ArenaBowl appearance for the Arizona Rattlers, and their third consecutive ArenaBowl championship. For the Cleveland Gladiators, this was the first ArenaBowl in the franchise's 18-year history.

Venue
ArenaBowl XXVII was played at Quicken Loans Arena in Cleveland, Ohio, after it was announced that the ArenaBowl would return to the practice of being hosted by the team with the better regular season record. With the best record of any team in the AFL in 2014, Cleveland was assured of hosting ArenaBowl XXVII by winning the conference championship. The ArenaBowl was played on a busy sports day in Cleveland, as the Cleveland Browns of the National Football League played a home preseason game at FirstEnergy Stadium and the Cleveland Indians of Major League Baseball had a home game at adjacent Progressive Field all at the same time.

Television
In December 2013, it was announced that ESPN had acquired the rights to broadcast arena football games, including ArenaBowl XXVI. This was the first ArenaBowl to be televised on ESPN since , prior to the year-long hiatus taken by the AFL.

Background

Arizona Rattlers

The Rattlers came into the game as two-time defending champions, appearing in their fourth consecutive ArenaBowl, and ninth overall, tying them with the Tampa Bay Storm for most ArenaBowl appearances. In trying to win their third consecutive ArenaBowl championship, the only team in ArenaBowl history that had done so was the Detroit Drive, having won the third in ArenaBowl IV. In , the Rattlers began the regular season with a 14–0 record, the best start to a season by any team in AFL history. Their first loss came in week 16 when they lost to the rival San Jose SaberCats. Despite losing last three of their last four games, the Rattlers finished the season 15–3, as they did the season prior. In the conference semifinals, they defeated the expansion Portland Thunder in a close 52–48 contest. They hosted the San Jose SaberCats in the conference championship, beating them more decisively, 72–56.

Cleveland Gladiators

The Gladiators reached the ArenaBowl for the first time in franchise history. Before moving to Cleveland for the  season, they had previously played in East Rutherford, New Jersey, and Las Vegas, Nevada. The closest the team had ever come to reaching the ArenaBowl since moving to Cleveland was in 2008 when they lost the conference championship. They began the  season with a 9–0 record, one of the best starts to a season in league history. In week 12, their hopes of an undefeated season were ended, but it proved to be the only blemish on their win–loss record, as they finished the season with a league-best 17–1 record. The 17 wins is a league record for a team in a single season. Not all of these wins came easy, however. Cleveland won five games in the regular season on the final play of the game. In the conference semifinals, they notched their sixth last-second win of the season. This one came against the Philadelphia Soul on a field goal as time expired to win by a 39–37 score. In the conference championship, they faced the Orlando Predators. Cleveland defeated Orlando 56–46 to reach the ArenaBowl for the first time in franchise history.

Box score

References

027
2014 Arena Football League season
Arizona Rattlers
Cleveland Gladiators
2014 in sports in Ohio
2010s in Cleveland
Sports competitions in Cleveland
2014 in American television
August 2014 sports events in the United States